The gens Caerellia was a minor Roman family during the late Republic and in imperial times.  It is known from only a few individuals.  Caerellia was a wealthy friend of Cicero, distinguished for her love of philosophical pursuits.  Caerellius Priscus was governor of Roman Britain in the late 2nd century.

See also
 List of Roman gentes

Footnotes

Roman gentes